The Canim River is a river in the South Cariboo region of the Interior of British Columbia, Canada.  It begins at the outlet of Canim Lake and runs approximately 1.8 km to Canim Falls, the river then continues approximately 9 kilometres via a canyon cut into a lava plateau, to Mahood Lake.

"Canim" means a type of large canoe in the Chinook Jargon.  The name was adopted in 1941, prior to which this stream, and also the Mahood River farther down the watercourse, were officially named as part of Bridge Creek.

See also
Wells Gray-Clearwater volcanic field
List of Chinook Jargon placenames
Canim Beach Provincial Park

References

Rivers of the Cariboo
Chinook Jargon place names
Wells Gray-Clearwater